A double check valve or double check assembly (DCA) is a backflow prevention device designed to protect water supplies from contamination. It is different from the two-way check valves (sometimes erroneously referred to as double check valves) used in air brake systems on heavy trucks which select from the highest pressure source.

It consists of two check valves assembled in series. This employs two operating principles: firstly one check valve will still act, even if the other is jammed wide open. Secondly the closure of one valve reduces the pressure differential across the other, allowing a more reliable seal and avoiding even minor leakage.

Small valves may be so compact as to be barely noticeable particularly when they are integrated into the bodies of existing taps (faucets). Larger check valves may be installed with ball valves at the ends, for isolation and testing. Often, test cocks (very small ball valves) are in place to attach test equipment for evaluating whether the double check assembly is still functional.

The double check valve assembly is suitable for prevention of back pressure and back siphonage, but is not suitable for high hazard applications. It is commonly used on lawn irrigation, fire sprinkler and combi-boiler systems. If the hazard is higher, even a relatively low hazard such as using antifreeze in the fire sprinkler system, then a more reliable check valve such as a reduced pressure zone device may be mandated.

Dual Check Valve

A dual check backflow preventer is similar to a double check valve in operation. It has two independent spring-loaded check valves. However, dual check valves usually do not include shutoff valves, may or may not be equipped with test cocks or ports and is generally less reliable than a double check valve.

See also
 Air gap
 Hydrostatic loop
 Pressure vacuum breaker
 Chemigation valve
 Reduced pressure principle BFP
 Atmospheric vacuum breaker 
 Reduced pressure zone device
 Air brake (road vehicle)

References

Plumbing valves
Irrigation
Backflow